is a city located in Aichi Prefecture, Japan. , the city had an estimated population of 81,954 in 35,583 households, and a population density of 3,897 persons per km².

Geography

Owariasahi is located in west-central Aichi Prefecture, north of the Nagoya metropolis. The Aichi Prefectural Forest Park covers approximately 15% of its area.

Climate
The city has a climate characterized by hot and humid summers, and relatively mild winters (Köppen climate classification Cfa).  The average annual temperature in Owariasahi is 15.5 °C. The average annual rainfall is 1665 mm with September as the wettest month. The temperatures are highest on average in August, at around 28.0 °C, and lowest in January, at around 4.0 °C.

Demographics
Per Japanese census data, the population of Owariasahi has been increasing rapidly over the past 50 years.

Surrounding municipalities
Aichi Prefecture
Nagoya（Moriyama-ku）
Seto
Nagakute

History

Late modern period
During the early Meiji period establishment of the modern municipalities system, the villages of Inba, Arai, and Yatsushiro were created within Higashikasugai District, Aichi.
The three villages merged to form the village of Asahi on July 16, 1906.

Contemporary history
Asahi was proclaimed a town on August 5, 1948.
Asahi was raised to city status on December 1, 1970.
In order to prevent confusion with the city of Asahi, Chiba or the town of Asahi, Aichi, the new city was named Owariasahi.

Government

Owariasahi has a mayor-council form of government with a directly elected mayor and a unicameral city legislature of 20 members. The city contributes one member to the Aichi Prefectural Assembly.  In terms of national politics, the city is part of Aichi District 7 of the lower house of the Diet of Japan.

External relations

Twin towns – Sister cities

National
Wajima（Ishikawa Prefecture, Chūbu region）
since July 18, 2012

Education

University
Nagoya Sangyo University

College
Nagoya Management Junior College

Schools
Owariasahi has nine public elementary schools and three public junior high schools operated by the city government, and one public high school operated by the Aichi Prefectural Board of Education.

Transportation

Railways

Conventional lines
Meitetsu
Seto Line：-  -  -  -  -

Roads

Expressway
 Tōmei Expressway

Japan National Route

Local attractions

Historic sites
Shiroyama Park
Asahi Castle
Skyward Asahi

Parks
Aichiken Forest Park
Obata Greens
Ima Pond

Notable people from Owariasahi
Hiromitsu Kanehara, mixed martial artist
Hiroto Takahashi, baseball player（Chunichi Dragons）

References

External links

 
 

 
Cities in Aichi Prefecture